The Annals of Statistics is a peer-reviewed statistics journal published by the Institute of Mathematical Statistics. It was started in 1973 as a continuation in part of the Annals of Mathematical Statistics (1930), which was split into the Annals of Statistics and the Annals of Probability.

The journal CiteScore is 5.8, and its SCImago Journal Rank is 5.877, both from 2020.

Articles older than 3 years are available on JSTOR, and all articles since 2004 are freely available on the arXiv.

Editorial board 
The following persons have been editors of the journal:

 Ingram Olkin (1972–1973)	
 I. Richard Savage (1974–1976)	
 Rupert Miller (1977–1979)
 David V. Hinkley (1980–1982)
 Michael D. Perlman (1983–1985)
 Willem van Zwet (1986–1988)
 Arthur Cohen (1988–1991)
 Michael Woodroofe (1992–1994)
 Larry Brown and John Rice (1995–1997)
 Hans-Rudolf Künsch and James O. Berger (1998–2000)
 John Marden and Jon A. Wellner (2001–2003)
 Morris Eaton and Jianqing Fan (2004–2006)
 Susan Murphy and Bernard Silverman (2007–2009)
 Peter Bühlmann and T. Tony Cai (2010–2012)
 Peter Hall and Runze Li (2013–2015)
 Ed George and Tailen Hsing (2016–2018)
 Richard J. Samworth and Ming Yuan (2019–2021)
 Enno Mammen and Lan Wang (2022–2024)

External links
 Annals of Statistics homepage
 Annals of Statistics at Project Euclid

References 

Statistics journals
Institute of Mathematical Statistics academic journals